Lugovaya is a rural locality (a village) in Beloozersky Selsoviet, Gafuriysky District, Bashkortostan, Russia. The population was 126 as of 2010. There are 4 streets.

Geography 
Lugovaya is located 29 km northwest of Krasnousolsky (the district's administrative centre) by road. Tatarsky Saskul is the nearest rural locality.

References 

Rural localities in Gafuriysky District